Robert Leo Kistler (March 4, 1925 – June 4, 2017) was an American politician in the state of Iowa. Kistler was born in Osceola, Iowa. He attended Simpson College, Drake University and University of Iowa, and was an educator. He served in the Iowa House of Representatives from 1989 to 1995, as a Republican.

References

1925 births
2017 deaths
Republican Party members of the Iowa House of Representatives
Simpson College alumni
Drake University alumni
University of Iowa alumni
Educators from Iowa
People from Osceola, Iowa